The Helpmann Award for Best Female Performer in an Opera is an award presented by Live Performance Australia (LPA) (the trade name for the Australian Entertainment Industry Association (AEIA)), an employers' organisation which serves as the peak body in the live entertainment and performing arts industries in Australia. The accolade is handed out at the annual Helpmann Awards, which celebrates achievements in musical theatre, contemporary music, comedy, opera, classical music, theatre, dance and physical theatre.


Winners and nominees
In the following list winners are listed first and marked in gold, in boldface, and the nominees are listed below with no highlight.

Source:

References

External links
Official Helpmann Awards website

O
Opera-related lists